Florence Given (born 1998) is a British illustrator, writer, feminist social activist, and influencer.

Life and career 

Given attended Plymouth College of Art from age 16 to 18 before moving from Plymouth to London in 2017 to study at the London College of Fashion. In 2018, she launched a petition to cancel the Netflix series Insatiable, which she accused of fat-shaming, gaining over 300,000 signatures. Given uses social media platforms, such as Instagram, to raise awareness of issues of sexuality, race and gender.

Given's first book, Women Don't Owe You Pretty, was published on 11 June 2020. It explores ideas in contemporary feminism. Given's second book, Girl Crush, was published in August 2022. A fiction book, it follows the bisexual woman Eartha after she goes viral on the internet. It topped the Sunday Times Bestseller List.

Her podcast Exactly launched in January 2022. With guests including Munroe Bergdorf, Sofie Hagen and Jameela Jamil, Given discusses sex, relationships and social media. It won the gold award for Best Marketing Campaign at the 2022 British Podcast Awards.

Influences 
Given has cited model and activist Munroe Bergdorf and fashion writer Chidera Eggerue as influences. Eggerue criticized Given's first book, Women Don't Owe You Pretty, as unusually similar to her own books in style and prose content. She argued that this was an instance of ideas from the black community being appropriated by white authors for profit.

Recognition 
Given won Cosmopolitans UK Influencer of the Year 2019 for her work on women's mental health. Irish magazine Her listed her among its Women of the Year 2019.

References

Further reading

External links 
Official web site
Official Instagram
YouTube interview as part of the Positive Chain series

1998 births
Living people
British illustrators
British women in business
Fashion influencers
People educated at Plymouth High School for Girls
21st-century British women artists
21st-century British women writers